Kermit is a male given name found mainly in the United States. It is a variant spelling of Kermode, a surname in the Isle of Man, which itself is a Manx language variant of Mac Diarmata, an Irish language patronymic anglicised MacDermot.  The name Kermit came to prominence through Kermit Roosevelt (1889–1943), son of U.S. President Theodore Roosevelt, named for Robert Kermit, a maternal great-uncle. The character Kermit the Frog, introduced in 1955, made the name known internationally through the television programs Sesame Street (from 1969) and The Muppet Show (from 1976).

People with the given name Kermit

A-G
 Kermit Alexander (born 1941), former American football player
 Kermit Beahan (1918–1989), U.S. Air Force officer who dropped the atomic bomb on Nagasaki
 Kermit Bloomgarden (1904–1976), American theatrical producer
 Kermit Blossor (1911–2006), namesake of the Kermit Blosser Ohio Athletics Hall of Fame
 Kermit Blount (born 1958), former head college football coach at Winston-Salem State University
 Kermit Brashear (born 1944), American politician
 Kermit Brown (born 1942), American politician
 Kermit Edward Bye (1937–2021), United States Circuit Judge
 Kermit S. Champa (1939–2004), American art historian and educator
 Kermit Cintrón (born 1979), boxer
 Kermit R. Cofer (1908–1989), associate justice of the Supreme Court of Mississippi
 Kermit Davis (born 1959), men's basketball head coach at Mississippi University
 Kermit Dial (1908–1982), American Negro league infielder
 Kermit Driscoll (born 1956), jazz bassist
 Kermit Eady (1940–2019), American social worker
 Kermit Erasmus (born 1990), footballer
 Kermit Goell (1915–1997), American songwriter and archaeologist
 Kermit Gordon (1916–1976), Director of the United States Bureau of the Budget
 Kermit Gosnell (born 1941), physician and convicted murderer

H-R
 Kermit L. Hall (1944–2006), legal historian and university president
 Kermit Holmes (born 1969), American basketball player and coach
 Kermit Hunter (1910–2001), playwright
 Kermit Johnson (born 1952), football player
 Kermit D. Johnson (1928–2020), American Army chaplain
 Kermit E. Krantz (1923–2007), physician
 Kermit Lipez (born 1941), United States Circuit Judge
 Kermit Love (1916–2008), puppeteer and actor
 Kermit Lynch (born 1941), wine importer, author, and winemaker
 Kermit Maynard (1897–1971), American actor and stuntman
 Kermit Moore (1929–2013), American conductor, cellist, and composer
 Kermit Moyer (born 1943), American author
 Kermit Murdock (1908–1981), American actor
 Kermit Oliver (born 1943), American painter
 Kermit Poling (born 1960), American conductor, violinist, and composer
 Kermit Quinn (fl. 1990s–2010s), American R&B singer
 Kermit Roosevelt (disambiguation), descendants of U.S. President Theodore Roosevelt
 Kermit Ruffins (born 1964), jazz musician

S-Z
 Kermit A. Sande (born 1943), American politician
 Kermit Schafer (1914–1979), writer and producer
 Kermit Schmidt (1908–1963), American football end and halfback
 Kermit Scott (1936–2008), American counselor and professor of philosophy
 Kermit Scott (musician) (died 2002), jazz tenor saxophonist
 Kermit Sheets (1915–2006), actor, director, playwright
 Kermit Smith (fl. 2000s–2020s), American college baseball player and coach
 Kermit Smith Jr. (1957–1995), convicted and executed murderer
 Kermit Staggers (1947–2019), politician
 Kermit Tesoro (born 1988), Filipino visual, installation, accessory, and fashion designer
 Kermit Tipton (died 2012), namesake of Kermit Tipton Stadium in Johnson City, Tennessee
 Kermit Tyler (1913–2010), American Air Force officer
 Kermit Van Every (1915–1998), American aeronautical engineer
 Kermit Wahl (1922–1987), American professional baseball player
 Kermit Washington (born 1951), former NBA basketball player
 Kermit Weeks (born 1953), aviation enthusiast and collector/restorer
 Kermit Whitfield (born 1993), American football wide receiver
 Kermit Williams (born 1954), American politician
 Kermit Zarley (born 1941), professional golfer and author

Fictional characters
 Kermit the Frog, of Muppets fame, introduced in 1955
 Kermit the Hermit, a 1965 book by Bill Peet
 Kermit William Hodges, the main character in Stephen King's Mercedes trilogy.

See also
 Edith Kermit Carow Roosevelt (1861–1948), second wife of U.S. President Theodore Roosevelt

References

Celtic given names
Irish masculine given names 
English masculine given names
Lists of people by given name